This list of presidents of Virginia Commonwealth University includes all presidents of VCU.

Virginia Commonwealth University
Virginia Commonwealth University administrators
Virginia Commonwealth